There are two species of lizard found in the Dominican Republic named Northern Hispaniolan green anole:
 Anolis callainus
 Anolis peynadoi